Christopher William Buescher (born October 29, 1992) is an American professional stock car racing driver. He competes full-time in the NASCAR Cup Series, driving the No. 17 Ford Mustang for RFK Racing. He is the 2012 ARCA Racing Series and 2015 NASCAR Xfinity Series champion and the cousin of 2012 NASCAR Camping World Truck Series champion James Buescher.

Racing career

ARCA Racing Series

Buescher began his professional racing career in 2005, driving Legends cars in Texas for Speedway Legends, winning over 100 races. (Speedway Legends, worked with several top drivers, David Ragan, Jonathan Davenport, etc.) In 2008, Buescher moved to North Carolina to be mentored by NASCAR Sprint Cup Series driver David Ragan and signing as a development driver for Roush Fenway Racing, Buescher began competing in ARCA competition in 2009; he went on to win the series championship in 2012, becoming the only driver ever to compete every lap in a season of competition in the series.

Xfinity Series
Buescher made his debut in NASCAR competition for Roush Fenway Racing in 2011, driving two races in the Nationwide Series; he returned to the series in 2013, driving in seven races for the team, in addition to a limited ARCA schedule with Roulo Bros. Racing.

In 2014, Buescher moved full-time to the Nationwide Series, driving the No. 60 Ford for Roush Fenway Racing. After failing to qualify at Daytona, Buescher had a solid rookie season, finishing ninth at Las Vegas, 7th at Richmond, second at Talladega, ninth at Charlotte, 11th at Dover, tenth at Michigan, and 12th at the July Daytona race. Buescher finished fifth at New Hampshire to earn a spot in the second Nationwide Dash 4 Cash race at Chicagoland; he would finish 8th at Chicago and 11th at Indianapolis. Fastenal returned to sponsor the 60 at Iowa, where Buescher finished 14th. Cup sponsors Kellogg's and Cheez-It sponsored the car at Watkins Glen. Buescher won the Nationwide Children's Hospital 200 at Mid-Ohio on August 16, his first career win.

Buescher returned to the No. 60 Ford in the newly renamed Xfinity Series for 2015. Buescher started the season with a runner-up finish to teammate Ryan Reed at Daytona in the Alert Today Florida 300. Then, Buescher followed up that second-place finish with another top-five finish, fourth, in the Hisense 250 at Atlanta giving him a tie for the points lead with a fellow competitor Ty Dillon. Buescher scored the second series win of his career at Iowa Speedway after passing Chase Elliott for the lead on the final restart of the race, Elliott had led 114 laps but couldn't hold off a hard charge from Buescher. Two weeks later, Buescher would be back in victory lane at Dover International Speedway for his second win in 2015; However, Buescher made contact with teammate Darrell Wallace Jr. near the end of the race to make the winning pass and Wallace was upset with his teammate as he cut a tire as a result of the contact and would go on to say "I would say I am happy Roush won but I’m not."

In the final race of the 2015 season, Buescher won his first career NASCAR Xfinity Series Championship at Homestead Miami Speedway on November 21, 2015. He finished 11th in the race after receiving the Lucky Dog to get back on the lead lap.  Kyle Larson won the race.  Buescher was able to hold off defending champion (of the then Nationwide Series) Chase Elliott, Ty Dillon, and Regan Smith in points to win the title.

Cup Series

Buescher made his Cup Series debut in the No. 34 Ford for Front Row Motorsports at Fontana in 2015, filling in for David Ragan, who had been substituting for Kyle Busch, who was out for a fractured leg; Buescher finished 20th. Buescher ran five additional Cup races for FRM in 2015.

On December 10, 2015, it was announced that Buescher would move up to Sprint Cup to drive FRM's No. 34 full-time in 2016. Front Row entered an alliance with Roush Fenway.

Superspeedway wrecks plagued the No. 34 team. Buescher started the season with a hard crash at Daytona with Matt DiBenedetto, finishing 39th. He described this accident, by calling it "the hardest hit of my career.” At Talladega, on lap 96, Buescher was involved in a crash that sent his car into a barrel roll, flipping three times before landing; he was not injured in the accident. Buescher also wrecked out of the summer Daytona race, finishing last.

Things began to turn around after Daytona, with Buescher finishing 14th in his rookie attempt at the Brickyard 400. One week later at Pocono, Buescher took the lead late in the Pennsylvania 400 by being on a different pit sequence. Buescher took the lead just before a massive cloud of fog moved over the track. After an hour of waiting, NASCAR gave up on trying to wait out the fog due to approaching severe weather and called the race, giving Buescher his first NASCAR Cup Series victory and the second win for Front Row Motorsports. Buescher, with the win, became the first driver since Joey Logano in 2009 to win a race as a Cup Series Rookie of the Year candidate (In 2011, Trevor Bayne won a race during his part-time rookie season but was not running for the Cup Series Rookie of the Year award). Buescher also became the first rookie to win at Pocono since Denny Hamlin in 2006. Buescher also brought Front Row Motorsports its first win in 118 races going back to David Ragan at Talladega in 2013. Despite the win, Buescher was not automatically guaranteed a Chase position because he was outside the Top 30 in driver points, the minimum standing required to qualify for the Chase. At Bristol, Buescher finished 5th to move into the 30th points position, moving past David Ragan. Buescher passed his teammate Landon Cassill for 29th in the standings at Richmond and locked in his place in the Chase.

He began the Chase in the 13th position in points. Buescher would be easily eliminated after the first round though due to underfunded equipment and poor finishes. He finished 28th at Chicagoland, 30th at New Hampshire, and 23rd at Dover.

On November 29, 2016, Roush Fenway announced the sale of their charter for the No. 16 car to JTG Daugherty Racing, with Buescher taking over the new ride. The car was officially announced as No. 37 on December 12, 2016.

Buescher began 2017 with a crash in the Daytona 500, finishing 35th. The next week at Atlanta, he finished 24th. In the next race, Las Vegas, he finished 23rd. He followed this up with a 27th place outing at Phoenix, and then 25th place at Auto Club. At Martinsville, Buescher scored a season-best 11th-place finish, one spot shy of a third career top 10. He eventually scored his first Top 10, with JTG at Daytona, finishing 10th. The Coke Zero 400 was also the first time that both JTG Daugherty cars finished inside the Top 10, with teammate A. J. Allmendinger finishing 8th.

In 2018, Buescher would get his third career Top 5 at both the February Daytona 500 race, and the July Daytona night race. He would be shy of three top 10 finishes in 2018, finishing in the 11th–13th position four times, and failed to finish thrice, once due to transmission failure. He ended the season 24th in points, two positions behind Allmendinger.

In 2019, Buescher scored the first consecutive Top 10 finishes of his Cup Series career, as he followed up a 10th-place finish at the 2019 Digital Ally 400 at Kansas Speedway with a sixth-place result at the 2019 Coca-Cola 600. On September 25, 2019, Roush Fenway Racing announced that Buescher will replace Ricky Stenhouse Jr. in the No. 17 Ford in 2020.

Buescher started the 2020 season with a 3rd-place finish in the Daytona 500. Buescher struggled initially when returning from the COVID-19 pandemic, but scored a Top 10 in the Coca-Cola 600. Through the latter half of the regular season, Buescher scored 4 more Top 10s, including 5th place at the inaugural Daytona Road Course race. Buescher would finish the season 21st in points, with a career-high 8 Top 10's throughout the season, doubling his previous best in a season which was 4.

Buescher displayed more consistency in his finishes during the 2021 season, staying within the top-20 in the points standings. He finished second at the 2021 Coke Zero Sugar 400 at Daytona, but was disqualified when his car failed post-race inspection due to a rear sub-frame assembly violation.

Buescher started the 2022 season with a 16th place finish at the 2022 Daytona 500. He also scored top-10 finishes at Phoenix, Atlanta, and Dover, where he recorded his first career Cup Series pole. At the Coca-Cola 600, Buescher was involved in a crash early in the final stage after he hit Daniel Suarez who spun on the restart. Buescher's right front wheel dug into the tri-oval grass, lifting the car off the ground and sending it into a barrel roll. Buescher's car rolled 5 times before landing upside down. After his car was rolled back over by safety officials, Buescher walked out of the car under his own power. Buescher was forced to miss Gateway after testing positive for COVID-19; he was substituted with Zane Smith. A week later, Buescher returned to the No. 17 and finished second to Daniel Suárez at Sonoma. On June 28, 2022, crew chief Scott Graves was suspended for four races due to a tire and wheel loss at Nashville. Despite not making the playoffs, Buescher led a race-high 169 laps and managed to score his second career win at the Bristol night race, snapping a 222 race winless streak for himself and a five-year drought for the team.

Personal life
Buescher married in 2018, during the Easter off weekend in the NASCAR schedule. In December 2022, he and his wife welcomed their first child, a daughter Charley.

Motorsports career results

Stock car career summary 

† As Buescher was a guest driver, he was ineligible for championship points.

NASCAR
(key) (Bold – Pole position awarded by qualifying time. Italics – Pole position earned by points standings or practice time. * – Most laps led.)

Cup Series

Daytona 500

Xfinity Series

 Season still in progress
 Ineligible for series points

ARCA Racing Series
(key) (Bold – Pole position awarded by qualifying time. Italics – Pole position earned by points standings or practice time. * – Most laps led.)

References

External links

Living people
1992 births
People from Prosper, Texas
Sportspeople from the Dallas–Fort Worth metroplex
Racing drivers from Texas
ARCA Menards Series drivers
NASCAR drivers
RFK Racing drivers
NASCAR Xfinity Series champions